The 1959 Winnipeg Blue Bombers finished in 1st place in the WIFU division with a 12–4 record. The Blue Bombers repeated as Grey Cup champions, having defeated the Hamilton Tiger-Cats once again to win the 47th Grey Cup.

Preseason

Regular season

Standings

Schedule

1 Actual game was won by Saskatchewan 37–30 but was immediately forfeited under CFL rules; the Roughriders had no healthy quarterback and resorted to suiting up their coach, Frank Trupicka, who as an American national was ineligible to be added to the roster at such a late date in the season.

Playoffs

Grey Cup

References

Winnipeg Blue Bombers seasons
N. J. Taylor Trophy championship seasons
Grey Cup championship seasons
Winnipeg Blue Bombers
1959 Canadian Football League season by team